Parakkalakkottai is a village in the Pattukkottai taluk of Thanjavur district, Tamil Nadu, India.

Demographics 

As per the 2001 census, Parakkalakkottai had a total population of 1311 with 622 males and 689 females; the sex ratio was 1.108. The literacy rate was 69.81%.

References 

 

Villages in Thanjavur district